Lipoprotein-associated phospholipase A2 (Lp-PLA2) also known as platelet-activating factor acetylhydrolase (PAF-AH) is a phospholipase A2 enzyme that in humans is encoded by the PLA2G7 gene. Lp-PLA2 is a 45-kDa protein of 441 amino acids. It is one of several PAF acetylhydrolases.

Function 

In the blood Lp-PLA2 travels mainly with low-density lipoprotein (LDL). Less than 20% is associated with high-density lipoprotein HDL. Several lines of evidence suggest that HDL-associated Lp-PLA2 may substantially contribute to the HDL antiatherogenic activities. It is an enzyme produced by inflammatory cells and hydrolyzes oxidized phospholipids in LDL.

Lp-PLA2 is platelet-activating factor (PAF) acetylhydrolase (EC 3.1.1.47), a secreted enzyme that catalyzes the degradation of PAF to inactive products by hydrolysis of the acetyl group at the sn-2 position, producing the biologically inactive products LYSO-PAF and acetate.

Clinical significance 

Lp-PLA2 is involved in the development of atherosclerosis, an observation that has prompted interest as a possible therapeutic target (see, e.g. the investigational drug Darapladib). In human atherosclerotic lesions, 2 main sources of Lp-PLA2 can be identified, including that which is brought into the intima bound to LDL (from the circulation), and that which is synthesized de novo by plaque inflammatory cells (macrophages, T cells, mast cells)."

It is used as a marker for cardiac disease.

A meta-analysis involving a total of 79,036 participants in 32 prospective studies found that Lp-PLA2 levels are positively correlated with increased risk of developing coronary heart disease and stroke.

See also 
Darapladib

References

Further reading 

 
 
 
 
 
 
 
 
 
 
 
 
 
 
 
 

Proteins